The 2019–20 season was the 52nd season of the Northern Premier League. After one season, the two divisions of Division One were re-aligned from West and East to North West and South East.

The League announced on 8 July 2019 that the new sponsors for 2019–20 were BetVictor.

As a result of the COVID-19 pandemic, this season's competition was formally abandoned on 26 March 2020, with all results from the season being expunged, and no promotion or relegation taking place to, from, or within the competition. On 30 March 2020, sixty-six non-league clubs sent an open letter to the Football Association requesting that they reconsider their decision. A legal appeal against the decision, funded by South Shields, was dismissed in June 2020.

Premier Division

Team changes
The following 5 clubs left the Premier Division before the season -
 Farsley Celtic – promoted to National League North
 Marine – relegated to NPL Division One North West
 North Ferriby United folded during the NPL Division One North West. A New North Ferriby Replaced in Northern Counties East League Division One.
 Workington – relegated to NPL Division One North West
 Hednesford Town – transferred to Southern League Premier Division Central

Marine had been in the highest division of the league for 40 consecutive seasons before their relegation.

The following 5 clubs joined the Premier Division before the season -
 Ashton United – relegated from National League North
 Atherton Collieries – promoted from NPL Division One West
 F.C. United of Manchester – relegated from National League North
 Morpeth Town – promoted from NPL Division One East
 Radcliffe – promoted from NPL Division One West

Premier Division table at the time of abandonment

Top 10 goalscorers

Updated to matches played on 14 March 2020

Results table

update=14 September 2019

Promotion play-offs

Semi-finals

Final

Stadia and locations

Division One North West

Team changes
The following 10 clubs left Division One West before the season -

 Atherton Collieries – promoted to NPL Premier Division
 Chasetown – transferred to NPL Division One South East
 Colwyn Bay resigned from the English Pyramid to join FAW Cymru North in the Welsh Pyramid
 Glossop North End – transferred to NPL Division One South East
 Kidsgrove Athletic – transferred to NPL Division One South East
 Leek Town – transferred to NPL Division One South East
 Market Drayton Town – transferred to NPL Division One South East
 Newcastle Town – transferred to NPL Division One South East
 Radcliffe – promoted to NPL Premier Division
 Skelmersdale United – relegated to North West Counties League Premier Division

The following 10 clubs joined Division One North West before the season -

 Brighouse Town – transferred from NPL Division One East
 City of Liverpool – promoted from North West Counties League Premier Division
 Dunston UTS – promoted from Northern League Division One
 Marine  – relegated from NPL Premier Division
 Marske United – transferred from NPL Division One East
 Ossett United – transferred from NPL Division One East
 Pickering Town – transferred from NPL Division One East
 Pontefract Collieries – transferred from NPL Division One East
 Tadcaster Albion – transferred from NPL Division One East
 Workington – relegated from NPL Premier Division

Division One North-West table at the time of abandonment

Top 10 goalscorers

Updated to matches played on 14 March 2019

Results table

|update=14 September 2019

Promotion play-offs

Semi-finals

Final

Relegation play-off

Stadia and locations

Division One South East

Team changes
The following 9 clubs left Division One East before the season -

 AFC Mansfield – demoted to Northern Counties East League Premier Division after their ground failed grading regulations
 Brighouse Town – transferred to NPL Division One North West
 Gresley – relegated to Midland League Premier Division
 Marske United – transferred to NPL Division One North West
 Morpeth Town – promoted to NPL Premier Division as Champions
 Ossett United – transferred to NPL Division One North West
 Pickering Town – transferred to NPL Division One North West
 Pontefract Collieries – transferred to NPL Division One North West
 Tadcaster Albion – transferred to NPL Division One North West

The following 9 clubs joined Division One South East before the season -

 Chasetown – transferred from NPL Division One West
 Glossop North End – transferred from NPL Division One West
 Ilkeston Town – promoted from Midland League Premier Division
 Kidsgrove Athletic – transferred from NPL Division One West
 Leek Town – transferred from NPL Division One West
 Market Drayton Town – transferred from NPL Division One West
 Newcastle Town – transferred from NPL Division One West
 Sutton Coldfield Town – transferred from Southern League Division One Central
 Worksop Town – promoted from Northern Counties East League Premier Division

Division One South-East table at the time of abandonment

Top 10 goalscorers

Updated to matches played on 14 March 2020

Results table

|update=14 September 2019

Promotion play-offs

Semi-finals

Final

Relegation play-off

Stadia and locations

Challenge Cup

The 2019–20 Northern Premier League Challenge Cup, known as the 2019–20 Integro Doodson League Cup for sponsorship reasons, is the 50th season of the Northern Premier League Challenge Cup, the main cup competition in the Northern Premier League. It was sponsored by Doodson Sport for an eighth consecutive season. 62 clubs entered the competition, beginning with the First Round, and all ties ended after 90 minutes and if the scores were level concluded with penalties.

The format from last season remains with two clubs to receive a bye into Round 2.

The defending champions are Trafford

The Competition alongside the League contest was abandoned with no title awarded due to the Coronavirus Pandemic

First round

Several First Round Ties were postponed from their original dates to allow teams to prepare for the FA Cup 2nd Qualifying Round on the following weekend

Second round

Third round

Quarter-finals

See also
Northern Premier League
2019–20 Isthmian League
2019–20 Southern League

Notes

References

External links
Official website

Northern Premier League seasons
7
Eng
Northern Premier League